Gellan lyase is an enzyme with systematic name gellan β-D-glucopyranosyl-(1→4)-D-glucopyranosyluronate lyase. This enzyme catalyses the following process:

 Eliminative cleavage of β-D-glucopyranosyl-(1→4)-β-D-glucopyranosyluronate bonds of gellan backbone releasing tetrasaccharides containing a 4-deoxy-4,5-unsaturated D-glucopyranosyluronic acid at the non-reducing end. The tetrasaccharide produced from deacetylated gellan is β-D-4-deoxy-Δ4-GlcAp-(1→4)-β-DGlcp-(1→4)-α-L-Rhap-(1→3)-β-D-Glcp.

References

External links 
 

EC 4.2.2